Annapolis is a monotypic genus of North American dwarf spiders containing the single species, Annapolis mossi. It was first described by Alfred Frank Millidge in 1984, and has only been found in United States.

See also
 List of Linyphiidae species

References

Linyphiidae
Spiders described in 1945
Spiders of the United States